Ak-Suu Integrated Reserve is a nature and game reserve located in the Ak-Suu rural community, Moskva District, Chüy Region, Kyrgyzstan. Established in 1971, it covers 7600 hectares.

References
 

Protected areas of Kyrgyzstan
Protected areas established in 1971